Open water swimming at the 2010 Asian Beach Games was held from 9 December to 11 December 2010 in Muscat, Oman.

Medalists

Men

Women

Medal table

Results

Men

5 km
9 December

10 km
11 December

Women

5 km
9 December

10 km
11 December

References
 Official site

2010 Asian Beach Games events
Asian Beach Games
2010